Cyperus subtilis is a species of sedge that is native to parts of Senegal.

See also 
 List of Cyperus species

References 

subtilis
Plants described in 2005
Flora of Senegal